George Robert "Rob" Swope (December 2, 1926, Washington, D.C. - January 9, 1967, Washington, D.C.) was an American jazz trombonist. He was the brother of Earl Swope.

Swope played with Buddy Rich in 1947 and Chubby Jackson in 1948-49, and also recorded with Jerry Wald in 1947. He worked with Gene Krupa in 1949-50, then with Elliot Lawrence in 1950-51. He led his own trio in the D.C. area in the early 1950s, and also was a member of The Orchestra, the band which accompanied Charlie Parker in 1953 and Dizzy Gillespie in 1955. He spent time in New York City in the latter half of the 1950s, playing with Larry Sonn, Boyd Raeburn, Claude Thornhill, Jimmy Dorsey, and Louie Bellson. In the 1960s he worked in Washington, D.C. again, often as a leader.

Discography
With Dizzy Gillespie
One Night in Washington (Elektra/Musician, 1955 [1983])

References
"Rob Swope". The New Grove Dictionary of Jazz.

1926 births
1967 deaths
20th-century American male musicians
20th-century American musicians
20th-century trombonists
American jazz trombonists
American male jazz musicians
Male trombonists
Musicians from Washington, D.C.